Bombay Gold Cup is a field hockey tournament organized by the Mumbai Hockey Association (MHA). It was instituted in 1955 by Naval Tata, the then President of the Bombay Hockey Association. The Cup was donated by the then Chief Minister of Maharashtra Morarji Desai in 1955. MHA organises this All India Hockey Tournament as an annual feature and is held every year at Mumbai, Maharashtra.

Venue
The matches are held at Mahindra Hockey Stadium.

Teams
The teams which participates in the tournament consists of public sector teams from across the country, such as Air India, Border Security Force, Central Railway, Bharat Petroleum, Punjab and Sind Bank etc.

Results
The results of the Bombay Gold Cup:

References

External links
Bombay Gold Cup

Sport in Mumbai
Field hockey in Maharashtra
Recurring sporting events established in 1955
Field hockey cup competitions in India